Two Alone is a 1934 American Pre-Code film directed by Elliott Nugent and starring Tom Brown and Jean Parker. According to RKO records the film lost $158,000. Based on the play Wild Birds by Dan Totheroh, most remember the film primarily for its early skinny-dipping scene. Jean Parker was borrowed from MGM.

References

External links

American drama films
American black-and-white films
Films about orphans
Films directed by Elliott Nugent
1934 drama films
1934 films
1930s American films